Elections to the Moray Council were held on 6 April 1995, the same day as the other Scottish local government elections. The election saw the SNP winning control of the council for the first time, taking control from the previous Independent administration.

Election results

Ward results

References

1995
1995 Scottish local elections
20th century in Moray